Federico Errázuriz Echaurren (Santiago, November 16, 1850 – Valparaíso, July 12, 1901) was a Chilean politician who served as the 12th President of Chile.

Early life
He was son of the president Federico Errázuriz Zañartu and of Eulogia Echaurren García-Huidobro. He studied at San Ignacio School of Santiago de Chile and in the National Institute of Santiago, where he received a bachelor's degree. He was joined the University of Chile where he became a lawyer on March 23, 1873.

In 1875 he married Gertrudis Echeñique Mujica, a direct descendant of the governor of Chile Martín de Mujica, of whom she was the last heir of the El Huique; They had six children: Juan José, Elena, Federico, Eulogia, Jorge and María Jesús.

Errázuriz Echaurren joined the Liberal Party and started his political life in 1876, when he was elected as a deputy for Constitución. He was reelected in 1879 and was characterized as a centrist politician. He did not participate in the campaigns of the War of the Pacific, preferring instead to remain in his hacienda, but during the religious controversies between Church and State under President Domingo Santa María, he joined the conservative forces. In August 1890, President José Manuel Balmaceda named him Minister of War and Navy, under the conciliation cabinet of Belisario Prats; but when Prats resigned his position, so did Errázuriz, and both joined the opposition. In 1891 he was one of the signers of the Act of Deposition of Presidente Balmaceda. Even so, he did not participate in the 1891 Chilean Civil War.

After the end of the civil war, he was elected deputy for Cauquenes and Constitución (1891–1894). His ill-health forced him to travel to Germany, in search of specialists. During a year and a half, he travelled through Europe, even visiting Pope Leo XIII. He returned to Chile and in 1894 was elected Senator for Maule and designed Minister of Justice and Public Instruction, under President Jorge Montt.

Presidency

After a very contested election, Errázuriz Echaurren was elected President and assumed power on September 18, 1896. He took over office at the age of 46, but by then he already was showing the symptoms of the illness that was going to kill him before the end of his mandate. Both his supporters and the opposition considered him a man of great political cunning, but while his supporters saw him as a true patriot, the opposition pictured him as a corrupt politician capable of the worst excesses. These characterizations made his rule difficult from the start, since he had a majority in the Senate but not in the Chamber of Deputies. He received a country where the economic situation had steadily worsened due to the progressive crisis of the nitrate industry and the associated unemployment and social crisis caused by it; while the international relationships with Perú, Bolivia, and Argentina were also in a critical state. To counteract the instability he tried to broaden the political consensus of his supporting coalition by forming a cabinet made up of three liberals and three conservatives, with the Liberal Aníbal Zañartu as Minister of the Interior. This seemingly impeccable arrangement only lasted for two months. In what was the norm during the governments of the period, Errázuriz Echaurren went on to have 17 cabinets during his administration.

Between 1896 and 1897, he named Carlos Antúnez as his Minister of the Interior and charged him with guaranteeing free and "clean" elections. Antúnez was in charge until after the general election of March 1897, considered his mission accomplished afterwards and resigned. These elections were greeted with general acceptance, but did not change the political support for the government, so Errázuriz Echaurren had to continue trying to achieve a balance, to maintain a semblance of political stability. In the course of this search, Errázuriz Echaurren became closer and closer to the Conservative Party, until in 1898 he named Carlos Walker Martínez, president of the Conservatives as Minister of the Interior. Nonetheless, he remained always loyal to the coalition that elected him, and for example never allowed any member of the Radical party into any of his cabinets. Errázuriz's responses to the cabinet crisis, elections and in general to any problem within his administration was always consistent. He never took any decision without first consulting his political basis in congress, and always subordinated himself to the will of the political parties.

Public policies
Errázuriz's administration was characterized by a marked advancement in public education. Under his direction several institutions for the development of health professionals were created, such as courses for matrons and nurses, the Professional School for Girls of Valparaíso, the Commercial Institute of Santiago, and new high schools in Santiago and Iquique. This administration also contributed with new tram systems in Santiago, Valparaíso, San Felipe and San Bernardo. Errázuriz Echaurren contracted the new sewerage system for Santiago, and the water reservoir of Peñuelas, which still provides the water for Valparaíso.

He faced his biggest problems in the area of monetary policy. The much-wanted return to the metallic conversion, to which he was opposed but which was favored by the parliamentary majorities, was shelved due to the threat of a war with Argentina. The delay of the measure until 1902 pushed the banking system to near collapse, forcing the government to issue and circulate paper money.

Argentine problem

The biggest problem that the administration had to face was on the international area.  Chile and Argentina were on the brink of war, due to long-standing border disputes stemming from the peace treaty of 1881, the situation of the Puna de Atacama (a disputed territory formerly owned by Bolivia and claimed by both countries) and an ongoing naval arms race. President Errázuriz was avowedly pacifist, but at one point both countries got to the point of calling up their reserve soldiers. The final solution was to submit the problem to an arbitration by the King of England, the adjudication of which was not resolved until 1902, during the administration of Germán Riesco, President Errázuriz's cousin and successor.

To celebrate the decision to arbitrate and avoid war, President Errázuriz and Argentinian President Julio Argentino Roca held an international meeting in the Strait of Magellan.

Succession controversy
Like most presidents of the time, he became involved early in the election of his successor.  The Liberal-Conservative Coalition that supported him went on to proclaim Germán Riesco, cousin and brother-in-law of President Errázuriz, as their candidate on March 8, 1901. The President responded in a public letter: 

[...] as I have the firm purpose of not intervening in any political campaign and I don't have or want to have any candidate, I am firmly resolved to prevent the participation of any member of this administration in the upcoming elections.

Health problems and death
Errázuriz's ill-health continued to plague him during all his period. Before his election, he already had had to travel to Germany in 1893 for treatment, and the death of his oldest son from tuberculosis in 1897 weakened him further. On June 11, 1900, he had to delegate his mandate to Elías Fernández Albano, the Vice President, so he could travel again to seek medical advice. He reassumed his duties on October 11 of the same year, but died suddenly of cerebral thrombosis on July 12, 1901, while in Valparaíso. He was constitutionally replaced by his Minister of the Interior Aníbal Zañartu, who assumed as Vice President for the remainder of his mandate.

Legacy 
In the late 18th century, zoologist and paleontologist Rodolfo Amando Philippi named a newly discovered species of plant after Errázuriz Echaurren: Errazurizia glandulifera, a "curious leguminous plant with 'long rat-tail spikes of flowers of a peculiar purple and yellow' with an 'incense-like' scent.

See also

 Martín de Mujica y Buitrón 
 President of Chile

References

External links

Short biography  
Genealogical chart of Errázuriz family 
Museum of El Huique 

1850 births
1901 deaths
People from Santiago
F
Chilean people of Basque descent
Liberal Party (Chile, 1849) politicians
Presidents of Chile
Chilean Ministers of Defense
Deputies of the XVIII Legislative Period of the National Congress of Chile
Deputies of the XIX Legislative Period of the National Congress of Chile
Deputies of the XX Legislative Period of the National Congress of Chile
Deputies of the XXI Legislative Period of the National Congress of Chile
Deputies of the XXIII Legislative Period of the National Congress of Chile
Senators of the XXIV Legislative Period of the National Congress of Chile
Candidates for President of Chile
Children of presidents of Chile
Instituto Nacional General José Miguel Carrera alumni
University of Chile alumni
People of the Chilean Civil War of 1891
Deaths from cerebral thrombosis